Trajanellidae is an extinct family of fossil sea snails, marine gastropod mollusks in the clade Caenogastropoda.

Genera
Genera within the family Trajanellidae include:

 Trajanella Popovici-Hatzeg, 1899, the type genus  (type species =  † Eulima amphora d’Orbigny, 1842)

References

 The Taxonomicon
 Paleobiology database info
 Kiel S. (2003) New taxonomic data for the gastropod fauna of the Umzamba Formation (Santonian–Campanian, South Africa); Cretaceous Research 24 (2003) 449–475

Prehistoric gastropods